As shown in the table below, GTK has a range of bindings for various languages that implement some or all of its feature set. GTK 2 is no longer supported, meaning some languages below do not have current GTK support.

 GObject (GOB) was initially written as a central component of GTK, but outsourced into GLib.
 GObject Introspection is a middleware layer between C libraries (using GObject) and language bindings, e.g. PyGObject uses this, while PyGTK does not.
 Official GNOME Bindings follow the GNOME release schedule which guarantees API stability and time-based releases.
 Glade Interface Designer

See also 
 List of language bindings for Qt 4
 List of language bindings for Qt 5
 List of language bindings for wxWidgets

References 

GTK language bindings